Ambite is a municipality in the province of Madrid in central Spain. It belongs to the comarca of Alcalá.

Ambite is home to the Palacio del Marqués de Legarda, which dates to the 17th century. It was built by Alonso de Terante y Cárdenas, the Spanish ambassador in Naples during the reign of King Felipe III.

Transport
The town of Ambite is serviced by three major bus lines 
260: Alcalá de Henares-Ambite-Orusco.
322: Arganda del Rey-Ambite.
326: Madrid (Conde de Casal)-Mondejar-Driebes.

Sites of interest
 Church of Our Lady of the Assumption
 Palace of Marqués de Legarda
 Monument of the Eyes
 Historical oak tree

References

External links 

http://www.ambite.es/ Official town council webpage, in Spanish
Instituto de Estadística de la Comunidad de Madrid > Ficha municipal
Instituto de Estadística de la Comunidad de Madrid > Series estadísticas del municipio
http://www.estedemadrid.com/
Instituto de Estadística de la Comunidad de Madrid > Nomenclátor Oficial y Callejero

Municipalities in the Community of Madrid